Four Seasons Orchestra a Scottsdale, Arizona-based Orchestra founded by the conductor, composer, violist and writer Carolyn Waters Broe in 1991.

History

1990s
The orchestra was founded in 1991 by Carolyn Waters Broe and started with its first performance in January 1992 at Phoenix Civic Center with an audience of 2,000 people at the first MLK Arts and Education Concert on Arizona's first MLK Day. The orchestra started performing regularly in the Phoenix metropolitan area. The orchestra has been reported to comprise 25 to 30 members.

In 1992, the Four Seasons Orchestra and Indian Women in Progress performed the Native American play "The Indians Discover Columbus" of Jefferson Award Winning storyteller Jean Chadhuri for the 500th anniversary of Native American Hospitality Day (also known as Columbus Day). World Premiere of Carolyn Broe's "Rebirth of the Goddess" and an Arizona premiere of Native American composer Brent Michael Davids' "Indian Overture" for flute and orchestra were also given.

2000s
The Four Seasons Orchestra performed at a 9-11 Tribute Concert in 2002 at the St. Joan of Arc Catholic Church as well as gave the world premieres of Tucson composer Thomas Woodson's "Fanfares for the Fallen Heroes and the Victims of 9-11".
The Four Seasons Orchestra was nominated for the Governor's Arts Award in 2003 and 2004 for Arts Education and Community Service. In 2005, the orchestra gave the Phoenix premiere of Gwyneth Walker's Bassoon Concerto as part of their "Baroque and Classical Women Composer's Concert" in downtown Phoenix at the Trinity First Episcopal Church. This concert was funded in part by a grant from the Phoenix Office of Arts and Culture.

The Four Seasons Orchestra toured to Austria in 2009 for their Haydn Bicentennial Festival. The orchestra performed the European premiere of ASU Professor Catalin Rotaru's transcription of Haydn's Cello Concerto in C for string bass with Rotaru as the bass soloist. They gave the World Premier of Professor Rotaru's transcription of Haydn's concerto at a concert in Phoenix before leaving for Europe. The orchestra also performed the European Premiere of Arizona composer Louise Lincoln Kerr's "Enchanted Mesa" for Orchestra and Soprano at the Konzerthaus in downtown Vienna on that concert.

2010s
In 2012, the Four Seasons Orchestra was granted official Arizona Centennial Legacy Project status by the Arizona Historical Foundation in 2012 for "Arizona Profiles" CD of Louise Lincoln Kerr's chamber music. This was the first CD ever recorded of Kerr's music. It is now in a time capsule at the Arizona State Library Archives, which will be opened in one hundred years on February 14, 2112 for the bicentennial of Arizona as a State.

They performed a Spanish Concert in 2013 featuring works by Classical Spanish composers and composers who were inspired by Spanish music. The Four Seasons Orchestra featured Los Angeles guitar solo artist Christopher Carelli performing Rodrigo's famous "Aranjuez Concerto for Guitar" on that concert. This concerto is rarely performed in the Phoenix area due to its difficulty level. Carelli was a protege of Angelo Romero.

In 2015, the orchestra performed their Vivaldi Four Seasons Concert featuring five young solo artists, three of whom were from ASU, performing all four of his Four Seasons Concertos. In January 2018, the Four Seasons Orchestra gave their "Mozart, Chopin & Friends Concert" featuring three young solo artists and the Rice Brothers. Johnny and Chris Rice performed Chopin's epic piano concertos on a nine-foot Steinway grand piano. They also performed Mozart's Sinfonia Concertante transcribed for two cellos. Tyler Clifton-Armenta performed Mozart's Clarinet Concerto. Rina Kubota performed Mozart's Violin Concerto in G, and Audrey Wang performed Hoffmeister's Viola Concerto. The orchestra was given a grant from the General Consulate of the Republic of Poland in Los Angeles for performing Chopin's music in Arizona.

The Four Seasons Orchestra has performed for the Ambassador's Ball in Phoenix numerous times hosted by various consulates here in Arizona and delivered numerous notable performances around the world with positive reviews.

Recordings
 Arizona Profiles: The Music of Louise Lincoln Kerr 2012.

Music directors, conductors
 Carolyn Waters Broe (principal conductor)

Notable past conductors
 Arthur Weisberg – conducted debut in January 1992.
 Sir Boris Brott of Canada.
 Eleanor Johnson – with her North Valley Chorale for a Vivaldi concert.

Grammy nominations
In the year, 2000, the Four Seasons Orchestra was nominated in two Grammy Award categories; "Best Small Ensemble" and "Best New Composition".

See also

 Vítězslava Kaprálová

References

External links
 Four Seasons Orchestra website

American orchestras